General Powlett may refer to:

Charles Armand Powlett (c. 1694–1751), British Army major general
Charles Powlett, 3rd Duke of Bolton (1685–1754), British Army lieutenant general
Charles Powlett, 5th Duke of Bolton (c. 1718–1765), British Army lieutenant general